Trichelodes delicatula is a species of beetle in the family Dermestidae, the only species in the genus Trichelodes.

References

Dermestidae